Edelmann (German for "nobleman") is a surname. Notable people with the surname include:

Heinz Edelmann (1934–2009), German illustrator and designer
Jean-Frédéric Edelmann (1749–1794), French classical composer
Otto Edelmann (1917–2003), Austrian singer
Samuli Edelmann (born 1968), Finnish actor and singer
Tino Edelmann (born 1985), German Nordic combined skier

See also
Edelman
Adelmann

German-language surnames
Jewish surnames
Occupational surnames
Yiddish-language surnames